Patent pirate  may refer to:

 Someone who willfully commits patent infringement
 Patent troll, someone who defends their patents with undue aggression, often with no intention to market or manufacture the patented invention
 Someone who utilizes a submarine patent, a type of patent whose issuance is intentionally delayed for several years to maximize benefit to the holder

See also
 Pirate (disambiguation)